Tiago Carvalho Santos (born 23 July 2002) is a Portuguese professional footballer who plays as a right-back for the Portuguese club Estoril.

Career
Santos is mostly a youth product of Sporting CP, with stints at the academies of Oeiras, Sacavenense, and moving to the U23 side of Estoril in 2021. On 9 July 2022, he was promoted to Estoril's senior side for the 2022-23 season.

Santos made his professional and Primeira Liga debut as a starter  in a 2–2 tie with Rio Ave on 19 August 2022, which he as assisted on the first goal of the match.

References

External links
 

2002 births
Living people
Footballers from Lisbon
Portuguese footballers
Association football fullbacks
G.D. Estoril Praia players
Primeira Liga players